USS Mervine may refer to the following ships of the United States Navy:

 , a Clemson-class destroyer, commissioned in 1921 and decommissioned in 1930
 , a Gleaves-class destroyer, commissioned in 1942 and decommissioned in 1949

United States Navy ship names